Kardeşler can refer to the following villages in Turkey:

 Kardeşler, Dursunbey
 Kardeşler, Zonguldak